Sound of Harmony is the world's most expensive grand piano, a Steinway & Sons art case piano built by Steinway's factory in Hamburg, Germany, in 2008 for €1.2 million. It took Steinway about four years to build the piano. The piano is decorated with inlays of 40 different woods, including the lid which replicates artwork by Chinese painter Shi Qi. The piano is owned by the art collector Guo Qingxiang and was chosen for use at the Expo 2010 Shanghai China.

References

Individual pianos
Steinway & Sons
2008 works